Zomby is a British electronic musician who began releasing music in 2007. He has released music on several labels, including Hyperdub, Werk Discs, and 4AD. Zomby's influences include oldschool jungle music and Wiley's eskibeat sound.

Career
Zomby's first major release was the Zomby EP in 2008 on the Hyperdub label. This was followed in the same year by the full-length album, Where Were U in '92?—the title both a reference M.I.A.'s song "XR2" and an homage to the rave scene of the early 1990s. This was reflected by the music which was a mixture of chiptune-inflected UK garage style with the more upbeat, ravey stylings of breakbeat house. Zomby used equipment from the period to record the album, such as the Akai S2000 sampler and Atari ST computer.

In 2009, he released a subsequent collection of tracks, One Foot Ahead of the Other.

In 2011, Zomby signed to 4AD Records, on which he released Dedication, also in 2011. In a four-star review in The Guardian, it was described as "an album of pensive, thought-provoking sadness," drawing comparisons to pianist Keith Jarrett and 1990s techno act Spooky. Later that year, he released the Nothing EP.

In 2013, Zomby released a double album, entitled With Love. On 9 October 2015, Zomby released 'Let's Jam 1 & 2' on XL Recordings.

Zomby's fourth album, Ultra, was released on the Hyperdub label in September 2016. It featured collaborations with Burial, Darkstar, HKE, Banshee and  Rezzett.

Plagiarism controversy
In early 2012, UK producer Reark posted a loop to SoundCloud entitled "Natalia's Song" he claimed to have written in 2007 and that Zomby had plagiarised. Reark later posted a YouTube video demonstrating the track laid out in music making software Reason. Reark had already reported copyright infringement in August 2011 to both 4AD and Zomby, and 4AD responded by co-crediting Reark on the single in late 2011.

Accusations of sexual assault

In February 2018, fellow musician Cult Days accused Zomby of sexual assault Zomby failed to confirm nor deny the claims.

Discography

Albums
 Where Were U in '92? (Werk Discs, 2008) 
 Dedication (4AD Records, 2011)
 With Love (4AD Records, 2013)
 Ultra (Hyperdub, 2016)
 Mercury's Rainbow (Modern Love, 2017)

EPs
 Memories (No label, 2007)
 Zomby (Hyperdub, 2008)
 One Foot Ahead of the Other (Ramp Recordings, 2009)
 Nothing (4AD Records, 2011)
 Let's Jam I & II (XL Recordings, 2015)
 Gasp! (Big Dada Recordings, 2017)

Singles
 "Memories (Darkstar Remix)" / "Saytar" (MG77 Recordings, 2007)
 "Liquid Dancehall" / "Strange Fruit" (Ramp Recordings, 2008)
 "Mu5h" / "Spliff Dub (Rustie Remix)" (Hyperdub, 2008)
 "Rumours & Revolutions" (Brainmath, 2008)
 "Spliff Dub (Sukh Knight Remix)" / "Spliff Dub (Starkey Remix)" (No label, 2008)
 "The Lie" (Ramp Recordings, 2008)
 "Digital Flora" (Brainmath, 2009)
 "Natalia's Song" (4AD Records, 2011)
 "A Devil Lay Here" / "Basquiat" (4AD Records, 2011)

References

External links
 Zomby at XL Recordings
 
 

1980 births
Living people
Dubstep musicians
English electronic musicians
English record producers
Masked musicians
UK garage musicians
Hyperdub artists
XL Recordings artists
4AD artists
Big Dada artists
People involved in plagiarism controversies